WEKG (810 AM) is a radio station  broadcasting a country music format. Licensed to Jackson, Kentucky, United States, the station is owned by Intermountain Broadcasting Co., Inc. and features programming from ABC Radio.

References

External links

EKG
Breathitt County, Kentucky
EKG